Lemin may refer to:
Lemin, Guangdong (乐民镇), township in Suixi County, Zhanjiang, Guangdong, China
Lemin, Guangxi, (乐民镇), township in Pubei County, Qinzhou, Guangxi, China
Lemin (乐民村), village in Jinggu Dai and Yi Autonomous County, Yunnan, China
Lemin, character in the 2000s Japanese science fiction novel series Spider Riders

Lemin is also a surname. People with this surname include:
Thomas Lemin (1905–1988), New Zealand cricketer
Greg Lemin (born 1968), Australian cricketer
Various members of a family which formerly owned the Australian heritage house of Trelawny, Black Hill, Ballarat

See also
Lemon (disambiguation)
Lenin (disambiguation)